Haley may refer to:


People and fictional characters
 Haley (given name), a list of people and characters with this name
 Haley (surname)

Geography
 Haley, Tennessee, an unincorporated community in the United States
 Haley Creek, Tennessee
 Haley Glacier, Palmer Land, Antarctica

Other uses
 Haley Industries, a Canadian metal castings manufacturer
 "Haley", a 2006 single by Needtobreathe

See also
Hailey (disambiguation)
Halley (disambiguation)
Hayley (disambiguation)